Osornophryne (plump toads) is a genus of true toads endemic to the Cordillera Central in Colombia and central Andes in Ecuador.

Species

References

External links

  taxon Osornophryne at http://www.eol.org.
  Taxon Osornophryne at https://www.itis.gov/index.html. (Accessed: May 5, 2008).
  Taxon Osornophryne at http://data.gbif.org/welcome.htm

 
Amphibians of South America
Amphibian genera